Karam is a given name and a surname.  People with the name include:

Given name

First name
Karam Gaber (born 1979), Egyptian Greco-Roman wrestler
Karam Hasanov (born 1969), Azerbaijani politician
Karam Chand Jain (1898–1967), Indian public administrator
Karam Khamis Sayd Khamsan (born c. 1969), Yemeni citizen detained at Guantanamo Bay 
Karam Mashour (born 1991), Israeli basketball player
Karam Nayyerloo (1943–1983), Iranian footballer 
Karam Chand Ramrakha (1933–2021), Fiji Indian lawyer 
Karam Ali Shah (1934–2020), Pakistani politician 
Karam Shyam, Indian politician
Karam Singh (historian) (1884–1930), Sikh historian
Karam Singh (1915–1993), Indian soldier
Karam Chand Thapar (1900–1962), Indian businessman

Middle name
Babu Karam Singh Bal (1927–1992), Indian politician and Sarpanch for Sathiala

Surname
Antoine Karam (French Guianan politician) (born 1950), President of the Regional Council of French Guiana 1992–2010
Antoine Karam (Lebanese politician) (born 1956), Lebanese politician 
Aram Karam (born 1926), Iraqi footballer
Elias Karam (born 1960), Assyrian singer from Syria
Fares Karam (born 1973), Lebanese singer 
Farid Karam, member of the World Scout Committee
Isabel Allende Karam, Cuban diplomat
Jaïr Karam, French football player and manager
Jean Michel Karam (born 1969), Franco-Lebanese engineer, inventor and entrepreneur 
Jesús Murillo Karam (born 1948), Mexican lawyer and politician 
Joe Karam (born 1951), New Zealand rugby player
Joey Karam, American musician 
Joseph Philippe Karam (1923–1976), Lebanese architect
Leïla Karam (1928–2008), Lebanese actress
Marc Karam (born 1980), Canadian professional poker player
 Melhem Karam (1932–2010), Lebanese writer and journalist
Michael Karam (born 1965), English-born Lebanese author and journalist
Mohammed Karam (born 1955), Kuwaiti footballer
Najwa Karam (born 1966), Lebanese singer
Natacha Karam (born 1995), British actress 
Sage Karam (born 1995), American racing driver
Salam Karam (born 1975), Swedish journalist
Salim Bey Karam (born 1946), Lebanese politician
Shadi A. Karam, Lebanese businessman 
Siobhan Karam (born 1986), Canadian ice dancer
Stephen Karam, American playwright
Tony Karam, founder of Canadian radio station CHOU (AM) 
Youssef Bey Karam (1823–1889), Lebanese Maronite rebel
Youssef Salim Karam (1910–1972), Lebanese politician

See also
Karam (disambiguation)